The Hannold Hill Formation is an Early Eocene (Wasatchian) geologic unit in the western United States. It preserves the fossilized remains of the ray Myliobatis and gar.

Fossil content 
The following fossils have been reported from the formation:
Glires
 Paramys excavatus
Pantodonta
 Caenolambda jepseni
 Coryphodon armatus
 Coryphodon sp.
Perissodactyla
 Hyracotherium vasacciense
 Minippus index
Placentalia
 Hyopsodus cf. wortmani
 Hyopsodus sp.
 Phenacodus sp.
Primates
 Phenacolemurinae indet.

Wasatchian correlations

References

Bibliography 

 Hunt, ReBecca K., Vincent L. Santucci and Jason Kenworthy. 2006. "A preliminary inventory of fossil fish from National Park Service units." in S.G. Lucas, J.A. Spielmann, P.M. Hester, J.P. Kenworthy, and V.L. Santucci (ed.s), Fossils from Federal Lands. New Mexico Museum of Natural History and Science Bulletin 34, pp. 63–69
 
 
 J. A. Schiebout and Et al. 1987. Stratigraphy of the Cretaceous-Tertiary and Paleocene-Eocene Transition Rocks of Big Bend National Park, Texas . Journal of Geology 95
 J. A. Wilson. 1967. Early Tertiary mammals. In R. A. Maxwell, J. T. Lonsdale, R. T. Hazzard, & J. A. Wilson (eds.), Geology of Big Bend National Park, Brewster County, Texas. The University of Texas Publication 6711:157-169

Geologic formations of Texas
Eocene Series of North America
Paleogene geology of Texas
Ypresian Stage
Wasatchian
Paleontology in Texas